Henryk Miłoszewicz (January 27, 1956 in Vilnius - April 5, 2003 in Włocławek) was a Polish football player. He played nine times for Poland.

References

 

1956 births
2003 deaths
Polish footballers
Poland international footballers
Zawisza Bydgoszcz players
ŁKS Łódź players
Legia Warsaw players
Lech Poznań players
Le Havre AC players
Expatriate footballers in France
Ligue 1 players
Ligue 2 players
Polish expatriate footballers
Polish expatriate sportspeople in France
Footballers from Vilnius
Soviet people of Polish descent
Soviet emigrants to Poland
Association football midfielders